Metec–Solarwatt p/b Mantel is a UCI Continental team founded in 2012 and based in the Netherlands. It participates in UCI Continental Circuits races.

Team roster

Major wins

2012
Stage 3 Olympia's Tour, Jeff Vermeulen
 National Time Trial championships, Peter Koning
Stage 1 Course de la Solidarité Olympique, Jeff Vermeulen
2013
Zuid Oost Drenthe Classic I, Jeff Vermeulen
Zuid Oost Drenthe Classic II, Brian van Goethem
Stages 1 & 3 Olympia's Tour, Jeff Vermeulen
2014
Overall Tour de Gironde, Remco te Brake
Stage 3, Remco te Brake
Stage 1 Okolo Slovenska, Team time trial
Stage 1 Czech Cycling Tour, Team time trial
2015
Stages 3 & 5 Volta ao Alentejo, Johim Ariesen
Ronde van Noord-Holland, Johim Ariesen
Stage 1 Ronde de l'Oise, Johim Ariesen
Overall Course de la Solidarité Olympique, Johim Ariesen
Stages 1, 2, 4 & 5, Johim Ariesen
Mountains classification Czech Cycling Tour, Oscar Riesebeek
Stage 3 Tour of China I, Johim Ariesen
2016
Stage 3 Volta ao Alentejo, Johim Ariesen
Stage 4 Volta ao Alentejo, Jarno Gmelich
Arno Wallaard Memorial, Maarten van Trijp
GP Viborg, Johim Ariesen
Skive–Løbet, Johim Ariesen
Stages 1 & 4 Bałtyk–Karkonosze Tour, Johim Ariesen
2017
Stage 2 Volta ao Alentejo, Johim Ariesen
Dorpenomloop Rucphen, Maarten van Trijp
2018
Stage 3 Tour de Normandie, Johim Ariesen
2019
Stage 3 Tour de Normandie, Arvid de Kleijn
Stage 3 Tour du Loir-et-Cher, Arvid de Kleijn
Overall Carpathian Couriers Race, Marijn van den Berg
Stage 1, David Dekker
Stage 2, Marijn van den Berg
Stage 4, Dennis van der Horst
Stage 2 Rhône-Alpes Isère Tour, Sjoerd Bax
Midden–Brabant Poort Omloop, Arvid de Kleijn
 National U23 Road Race championships, David Dekker
Stage 1 Course de Solidarność et des Champions Olympiques, Arvid de Kleijn
Stage 4 Kreiz Breizh Elites, Arvid de Kleijn
Druivenkoers Overijse, Arvid de Kleijn
2022
Stage 6 Tour de Normandie, Tim Marsman
Stage 5 Tour du Loir-et-Cher, Rick Ottema

References

External links

UCI Continental Teams (Europe)
Cycling teams based in the Netherlands
Cycling teams established in 2012